is a town located in Fukushima Prefecture, Japan. ,  the town had an estimated population of 13,827 in 5053 households, and a population density of 86 persons per km².

Geography
Tanagura is located in the southernmost portion of Fukushima prefecture, bordering on Tochigi Prefecture to the west and Ibaraki Prefecture to the south. 
Mountains: Yamizosan (1021.8m) 
Rivers: Kuji River

Neighboring municipalities
 Fukushima Prefecture
 Shirakawa
 Yamatsuri
 Samegawa
 Asakawa
 Hanawa
Ibaraki Prefecture
 Daigo
Tochigi Prefecture
 Ōtawara
 Nasu

Demographics
Per Japanese census data, the population of Tanagura was relatively constant throughout the late 20th century but has begun to decline in the 21st.

Tanagura has been recognized by Japan's Office for the Promotion of Regional Revitalization (Kishida Cabinet Secretariat), which promotes the development of new technologies to combat depopulation, for its digital transformation/telework infrastructure. Related projects have been awarded over ¥6M in government grants.

Climate
Tanagura has a humid climate (Köppen climate classification Cfa).

History
The area of present-day Tanagura was part of ancient Mutsu Province. The area formed part of the holdings of Tanagura Domain, in the Edo period. After the Meiji Restoration, it was organized as part  Higashishirakawa District within the Nakadōri region of Iwaki Province. Tanagura Town was formed on April 1, 1889 with the creation of the modern municipalities system. The town expanded on January 1, 1950 by the annexation of the neighboring villages of Yashirogawa, Chikaatsu, Yamaoka and Takano.

Economy
Tanagura has a mixed economy with agriculture and precision manufacturing predominating.

Education
Tanagura has five public elementary schools and one public junior high school operated by the town government, and one public high school operated by the Fukushima Prefectural Board of Education.

High schools 
Tanagura High School

Junior High school 
Tanagura Junior High School

Elementary schools 
Tanagura Elementary School
Yashirogawa Elementary School
Chikatsu Elementary School
Takabo Elementary School
Yamaoka Elementary School

Transportation

Railway
JR East – Suigun Line
  -  -

Highway

International relations
 – Sparta, Greece, Friendship Cities from September 23, 1986
 – Lake Macquarie, New South Wales, Australia from October 8, 2002

Local attractions
Site of Tanagura Castle, National Historic Site
Nagare temple ruins, National Historic Site
Tsutsuwake Shrine

References

External links

 
Towns in Fukushima Prefecture